The 2009–10 North Texas Mean Green men's basketball team (often referred to as "North Texas" or the "Mean Green") represented the University of North Texas in the 2009–10 college basketball season. The team was led by head coach Johnny Jones and played their home games on campus at the Super Pit in Denton, Texas. In 2009–10, North Texas set a new school-record with 24 wins, and the Mean Green won the Sun Belt Conference tournament title to advance to the NCAA tournament. As the No. 15 seed in the West region, UNT lost to No. 2 seed Kansas State in the Round of 64.

Roster

Schedule and results

|-
!colspan=9 style=| Regular season

|-
!colspan=9 style=| Sun Belt tournament

|-
!colspan=9 style=| NCAA tournament

References

North Texas Mean Green men's basketball seasons
North Texas
North Texas
North Texas Mean Green men's basketball team
North Texas Mean Green men's basketball team